Chaillevois is a commune in the Aisne department in Hauts-de-France in northern France.

Geography
The river Ailette forms part of the commune's southern border.

The name of this village seems derive from an old path that probably happened in this place, callis via, or royal road.  In 1760, most of the villagers made their living from forestry, agriculture or viticulture.  The village once belonged to the bishops of Aaon, who lost possession in the French Revolution.  It was also the home town of Jean-Baptiste Tholmé, a general in the time of the Revolution.

Population

See also
Communes of the Aisne department

References

Communes of Aisne
Aisne communes articles needing translation from French Wikipedia